The 2014 United States House of Representatives elections in Washington were held on Tuesday, November 4, 2014 to elect the ten U.S. representatives from the state of Washington, one from each of the state's 10 congressional districts. The elections coincided with other elections to the House of Representatives, other elections to the United States Senate and various state and local elections. The state certified the results on December 4. The nonpartisan blanket primary election was held on August 5, with the top two candidates for each position advancing to the general election.

Overview
Summary of votes cast in the general election

By district
Results of the 2014 United States House of Representatives elections in Washington by district:

District 1

The first district was represented by Democrat Suzan DelBene since her special election to replace Jay Inslee, who resigned to serve as Governor of Washington in 2012. DelBene won re-election.

In the primary DelBene easily advanced to face former Microsoft software engineer Pedro Celis, who defeated three fellow Republicans and two independent candidates in the top-two primary.

Blanket primary results

General election

Polling

Results

District 2

The second district was represented by Democrat Rick Larsen since 2001. Larsen won re-election, defeating Republican B.J. Guillot in the general election. Independent Mike Lapointe was eliminated in the primary.

Blanket primary results

General election

Results

District 3

The third district was represented by Republican Jaime Herrera Beutler since 2011. Herrera Beutler won re-election. Businessman and former Maria Cantwell aide Bob Dingethal ran as a Democrat, facing Herrera Beutler in the general election.

In the primary, Herrera Beutler was also opposed by Republican Michael Delavar, who ran against Brian Baird in 2008 and served as a councilman for Washougal from 2009 to 2011.

Blanket primary results

General election

Results

District 4

The 4th district is a large and predominantly rural district in Central Washington that encompasses numerous counties and is dominated by the Tri-Cities and Yakima areas. Republican Doc Hastings, who represented the 4th district since 1995, retired.

The district was not considered to be competitive. The last time any Democrat running for any partisan office carried it was when State Auditor Brian Sonntag was re-elected in 2004.

For the first time in Washington state history, the winners of the top-two primary for a U.S. Congressional race were members of the same party. Clint Didier and Dan Newhouse, both Republicans, competed for the seat in November. Although only one "serious" Democratic candidate was on the ballot, Estakio Beltran, David Wasserman of The Cook Political Report speculated that without an incumbent for Democrats to vote against and recognising that Beltran had "no hope" of winning the seat in November, 4th district Democrats might have "strategically [voted] for a Republican they may favor." Ultimately, Dan Newhouse won the seat.

Republican Party

Candidates

Declared
 George Cicotte, attorney
 Clint Didier, former NFL player, candidate for the U.S. Senate in 2010 and nominee for Washington Commissioner of Public Lands in 2012
 Janéa Holmquist Newbry, state senator
 Kevin Midbust, drugstore supervisor
 Dan Newhouse, former director of the Washington State Department of Agriculture under Christine Gregoire and Jay Inslee and former state representative
 Gordon Allen Pross, perennial candidate
 Gavin Seim, libertarian activist
 Glen R. Stockwell, economic development specialist

Withdrew
 Brad Peck, Franklin County Commissioner
 Jamie Wheeler, caregiver and candidate for the seat in 2012

Declined
 Sharon Brown, state senator
 Micah Cawley, Mayor of Yakima
 Bruce Chandler, state representative
 Jerome Delvin, Benton County Commissioner and former state senator
 Doc Hastings, incumbent U.S. Representative
 Curtis King, state senator
 Brad Klippert, state representative and candidate for the U.S. Senate in 2004 and 2006
 Matt Manweller, state representative
 Charles Ross, state representative
 David Taylor, state representative
 Judith Warnick, state representative (running for the state senate)

Democratic Party

Candidates

Declared
 Estakio Beltran, former congressional policy adviser
 Tony Sandoval, businessman and activist

Withdrew
 Joe Buchanan, mechanical engineer
 Gary Downing, artist and photographer
 Mohammed Said, physician and candidate for this seat in 2012
 Tony Williams

Independent

Candidates

Declared
 Josh Ramirez, project control specialist at Washington River Protection Solutions
 Richard Wright, retired physical therapist

Endorsements

Blanket primary results

General election

Polling

Results

District 5

The fifth district was represented by Republican Cathy McMorris Rodgers, the House Republican Conference Chairwoman, since 2005. She won re-election. Her chief opponent was Democrat Joe Pakootas, the chief executive officer of the Colville Tribal Federal Corporation, ran against her.

Blanket primary results

General election

Results

District 6

The sixth district was represented by Democrat Derek Kilmer since 2013, who was re-elected, defeating Republican candidate Marty McClendon in the general election.

Blanket primary results

General election

Results

District 7

The seventh district was represented by Democrat Jim McDermott since 1989. McDermott won re-election against Craig Keller, Republican, with over 80% of the vote.

Blanket primary results

General election

Results

District 8

The eight district was represented by Republican Dave Reichert since 2005. Reichert was re-elected. Democrat Jason Ritchie, an Issaquah small business owner, was the challenger in the general election.

External links
Dave Reichert campaign website
Jason Ritchie campaign website

Blanket primary results

General election

Results

District 9

The ninth district was represented by Democrat Adam Smith beginning in 1997. He was re-elected, defeating Republican Doug Basler.

Blanket primary results

General election

Results

District 10

The tenth district was represented by Democrat Denny Heck since 2013, who won re-election. Pierce County Councilwoman and former state representative Joyce McDonald ran against him as a Republican.

Blanket primary results

General election

Results

References

External links
U.S. House elections in Washington, 2014 at Ballotpedia
Campaign contributions at OpenSecrets

Washington
2014
2014 Washington (state) elections